Mwingi North Constituency is an electoral constituency in Kenya. It is one of eight constituencies in Kitui County. It used to be one of two constituencies in Mwingi District. The constituency was established for the 1997 elections.

The immediate former MP of Mwingi North MP was Kalonzo Musyoka, the former vice-president of Kenya. He had represented the Kitui North Constituency, which was split before the 1997 elections.

Members of Parliament

Locations and wards

References

External links 
Map of the constituency

Constituencies in Kitui County
Constituencies in Eastern Province (Kenya)
1997 establishments in Kenya
Constituencies established in 1997